Bobble may refer to:
 Bobble, another name for stasis (fiction) in Vernor Vinge's Peace Authority science fiction series
 Bobble (knitting), a form of stitching in knitting
 Bobble (textile), small round pieces of fabric that form on natural fabrics through use
 Bobble hat, a knit beanie hat with a "bobble" (pom pom) at the top
 Bobblehead, a doll that moves or "bobbles" its head